Amadeus August (6 May 1942 in Breslau – 6 July 1992 in Munich) was a German actor and singer.

Career 
Amadeus August  became famous throughout Europe as protagonist of the successful European TV series Quentin Durward (based on Walter Scott's novel of the same name), broadcast for the first time in 1971. Although it turned out that this role marked the peak of his career, he frequently was a guest star in TV shows, such as Derrick. He also had a supporting role as the Count of Haugwitz-Reventlow in The Barbara Hutton Story in 1987.

He died of AIDS. His sepulchre is in the cemetery of Unterhaching.

Filmography

References 

1942 births
1992 deaths
German male television actors
German male film actors
Actors from Wrocław
20th-century German male actors
People from the Province of Silesia
AIDS-related deaths in Germany